John White (born October 12, 1940) is an American politician. He served as a Democratic member for the 132nd district of the Georgia House of Representatives.

Life and career 
White was born in Montgomery County, Alabama. He attended Texas A&M University.

White was elected to the 132nd district of the Georgia House of Representatives on November 5, 1974, assuming office in 1975. He served until the 1990s.

References 

1940 births
Living people
People from Montgomery County, Alabama
Democratic Party members of the Georgia House of Representatives
20th-century American politicians
Texas A&M University alumni
20th-century African-American politicians